Soyuz TMA-12 was a Soyuz mission to the International Space Station (ISS) which was launched by a Soyuz FG rocket at 11:16 UTC on 8 April 2008. It docked to the Pirs module of the station on 10 April 2008. Landing occurred at 03:37 on 24 October. It was the first nominal landing in three missions, following separation failures on the Soyuz TMA-10 and 11 spacecraft.

Crew

Backup crew

Crew Notes
Yi So-yeon flew as a guest of the Russian government through the Korean Astronaut Program after the Korean government paid the Russian government 25 million US dollars in agreement to support the first Korean astronaut in space. Her role aboard the Soyuz is referred to as a Spaceflight Participant in English-language Russian Federal Space Agency and NASA documents and press briefings. Ko San was originally scheduled to fly, with Yi as his backup. On 10 March 2008, it was announced that Ko breached regulations surrounding removal of books from the training centre in Russia, and therefore would not be allowed to fly.

Richard Garriott flew as a private astronaut through a program run by Space Adventures. He is also referred to as a Spaceflight Participant in English-language RKA and NASA documents.

Soyuz TMA-12 saw the joined landing of the world's first two second-generation space travellers, Sergey Volkov and Richard Garriott. Volkov's father, Aleksandr Volkov, flew to space three times and visited the Salyut 7 and Mir space stations. Garriott's father, Owen Garriott, flew to space twice and visited the Skylab space station.

References

Crewed Soyuz missions
Spacecraft launched in 2008
Orbital space tourism missions
Spacecraft which reentered in 2008
Spacecraft launched by Soyuz-FG rockets